KIIT Polytechnic is a co-educational, technology institution in Bhubaneswar, Odisha, India. Established in the year 1995 and run by KIIT Group of Institutions, the institution is approved by All India Council of Technical Education and affiliated to the Directorate of Technical Education, Odisha and the State Council of Technical Education & Vocational Training in Odisha. KIIT Polytechnic offers diploma level technical education to its students in six distinct streams: civil, computer science, electrical, electronics and telecommunications, mechanical, and metallurgical engineering.

Admission
Admission to KIIT Polytechnic was only through the Diploma Entrance Test conducted by the DTE&T, Government of Odisha, until 2015. Starting in 2016, admission became open to whoever passed 10th board exam from any board. Admission depends on availability of seats remaining in respective branches.

Departments

External links 
Official Home Page of KIIT Polytechnic
Admission related

Universities and colleges in Bhubaneswar
Science and technology in Bhubaneswar
Kalinga Institute of Industrial Technology
Educational institutions established in 1995
1995 establishments in Orissa